Kirpichny is a rural locality (a khutor) in Gustomoysky Selsoviet Rural Settlement, Lgovsky District, Kursk Oblast, Russia. Population:

Geography 
The khutor is located on the Seym River (a left tributary of the Desna), 43 km from the Russia–Ukraine border, 77 km west of Kursk, 14 km north-west of the district center – the town Lgov, 10 km from the selsoviet center – Gustomoy.

 Climate
Kirpichny has a warm-summer humid continental climate (Dfb in the Köppen climate classification).

Transport 
Kirpichny is located 10 km from the road of regional importance  (Kursk – Lgov – Rylsk – border with Ukraine) as part of the European route E38, 12.5 km from the road  (Lgov – Konyshyovka), 16.5 km from the road of intermunicipal significance  (Konyshyovka – Makaro-Petrovskoye, with the access road to the villages of Belyayevo and Chernicheno), 3.5 km from the road  (38N-144 – Shustovo – Korobkino), 13 km from the nearest railway station Sherekino (railway line Navlya – Lgov-Kiyevsky).

The rural locality is situated 84 km from Kursk Vostochny Airport, 158 km from Belgorod International Airport and 287 km from Voronezh Peter the Great Airport.

References

Notes

Sources

Rural localities in Lgovsky District